Qimei Airport or Chi Mei Airport  is an airport serving Cimei, Penghu, an island in Penghu County, Taiwan (ROC).

History
The Penghu County Government approved the building of the airport in 1977 for those on Cimei in order to improve the traffic for the people who live in the county. The runway was redone in 1995, and is currently under the control of Civil Aeronautics Administration since 11 May 1996.

Facilities

Airlines and destinations

See also
 Civil Aeronautics Administration (Taiwan)
 Transportation in Taiwan
 List of airports in Taiwan
 Penghu Airport

References

External links

 Qimei Airport
 

1977 establishments in Taiwan
Airports established in 1977
Airports in Penghu County